Riomalo de Abajo is a hamlet and alqueria located in the municipality of Caminomorisco, in Cáceres province, Extremadura, Spain. As of 2020, it has a population of 36.

Geography 
Riomalo de Abajo is located 158km north-northeast of Cáceres, Spain.

References

Populated places in the Province of Cáceres